Luisa Richter (June 30, 1928 - October 29, 2015) born Louise Kaelble, was a Venezuelan-based graphic artist and professor originally from Germany. She was born in Besigheim, Germany and died in Caracas, Venezuela. Her art was heavily influenced by post-war movements and Bauhaus. She later moved to Venezuela in 1955 where she spent the rest of her life, won many awards International awards, became a professor at the Neumann Institute in Caracas, and founded Prodiseño, one of the biggest graphic design schools in Venezuela.

Early life 
Born in Besigheim, Germany in 1928 Richter was the daughter of engineer and architect Albert Kaelble and Gertrud Unkel. In 1946 she studied at the März en Stuttgart Academy in Germany and started her career as an artist at The Independent School of Art in Stuttgart. Between 1949 and 1955 she studied under the guidance of her master Willi Baumeister (one of the main figures in abstract art in Europe back then) at the State Academy of Fine Arts Stuttgart. During this period, she started working on illustrations for the magazines Stuttgarter Leben and Die Welt der Frau, and the editorials Egon Schuler and Bechtle Verlag, after this, she moved away and lived in between Paris and Rome. Between 1950 and 1953 Richter studied existentialism from Max Bense at the Technical University of Stuttgart. In September 1955 she married Hans Joachim Richter and in December both decided to move to Caracas, Venezuela because of her husband's profession.

Career 
In 1958 she becomes part of national salons exhibiting four monotypes at the 19th official Salon in Venezuela. At the 20th official Salon in Venezuela she exhibited three oils: Event, Transparent, and Soft Modulation. In 1959 she hosted her own individual exhibit at the MBA where works like Hieroglyph and Gilgamesh were shown, next year she joined the collection called “Living Spaces” hosted at the Municipal Castle of Maracaibo and also joined the Experimental Salon at Sala Mendoza, it was a mixture of plastic post-war tendencies that focused their main interests in reflecting about matter and gesture. With this in mind Ricardo Pau-Llosa pointed out “Richter took the refined visual lexicon of Informalism and directed it toward other ends; Transformed it into the instrument with which to reflect on one of the most complex acts of consciousness-thinking visually-“.

Ever since then, she started doing Cortes de Tierra (1958-1963), that are pieces close to monochrome palettes, rich textures, and conscious bidimensionality. Around 1961 she starts a series of drawings called Crosses and Connections that extend the expressionist school seen from a Tachist and gestural point of view. She also starts working on lithographs in Stuttgart (Germany) along with Erich Mönch. In 1963 she returns to figurative painting and produces artwork like Triptych (oil on canvas, 1963), where the human figure is in a constant struggle with abstractism. References of mythology and existential literature are frequent in the production of her work and during these years, Richter starts working at Luisa Palacio's engraving workshop. In 1964 she explores the collage technique, which she masters in a short period of time. Besides oils, Luisa Richter has produced a series of work done with gouache Reflejos (1973-1989) and pastels Andamios Suspendidos (1978-1988); oftentimes her work was richly mixed media such as in Crucifixión (collage & gouache, 1981) or Tejido sideral (oils & collage, 1983), which were two of her groundbreaking pieces. In 1966 she joins the exhibit “Emergent Decade" at the Guggenheim Museum, where one of the biggest shows of Latin American art was being held that decade. Her reflections on plane and two-dimensionality, plastic elements, and representative icons have made her work "a theater of visual thought" (Pau-Llosa, 1991, s.p.)

In 1967 she is granted the National Prize of Drawing and Engraving by Rhoni K. in Venezuela, in 1968 she starts a series of landscapes named Espacios Planos, and in 1972 she also starts a series of portraits based on expressionist tradition “Blanca de Gerlach” (Gan Collection). From 1969 until 1987 she taught classes as an analytical and compositional drawing at the Neumann Institute, one of the first graphic designs schools in Venezuela. In 1978 she represents Venezuela at the XXXVIII Bienal de Venecia, where she showed 12 monumental oil paintings, her series “Espacios Planos”, and 60 different collages and texts related to art and existentialism.

As an artist, Juan Calzadilla wrote: "investigative, yet at the same time she manifests in her entire work a strange, obsessive loyalty to an authentic and sincere language." At first, under the influence of her tutor Willi Baumeister, she carried out abstraction in which she was ahead compared to others and even to her own "informality stage" of 1959, in works characterized by the use of lumpy textures and atmospheric suggestion; the subject of cuts and division of the Venezuelan land. After 1963, and through graphic means, she tried to express in her art a different type of symbols with the use of impulsive strokes and lines the period of his first collages, and paintings that would lead later, from 1966 to 1969 to an intermezzo of figurative, and from then until 1977, are occasionally created portraits that she treated as rehearsals or “tryouts”.

Her search proves the legitimacy of what was already implicit at her informal age: the apprehension of an internalized climate in her work with a blind and elemental force, where the forms begin to define themselves in an expectant world that emerges from the hollow and refuses to be something other than paint. The intensity of her work corresponds to the urgency in which her restlessness seeks to be resolved and as an outcome, a tremendous diversity of extreme experiments and gestures are seen among her work. Luisa Richter does not feel obliged to follow the conventions dictated by external pressures; her painting is nothing more than what she can not stop being or doing. In her collection, GAN owns this artist works from her first informality stage, such as Pintura (oil and sand on canvas, 1960), pieces of her figurative period, such as “Superposed” (oil, putty and collage on canvas, 1965–1967), collages as “Golondrinas fall to the pavement” (1981), as well as gouaches, drawings, and graphic work.

Legacy 
While her time in Venezuela, Richter founded Prodiseño, one of the biggest graphic design schools in the country; she also was a part-time professor at the Neumann Art Institute in Caracas, Venezuela where she taught technical drawing and analytical drawing. After establishing a long career in South American lands, Richter died at the age 87, leaving one of the biggest contributions she could ever do to a country that has, not only welcomed, but produced important classical and contemporary artists alike.

References

1928 births
2015 deaths
People from Besigheim
People from the Free People's State of Württemberg
German emigrants to Venezuela
People from Caracas
Venezuelan artists
Venezuelan contemporary artists